Anfeng may refer to:

Towns
 Anfeng, Dongtai (安丰镇), a town in Dongtai, Jiangsu Province
 Anfeng, Shou County (安丰镇), a town in Shou County, Anhui Province

Townships
 Anfeng, Anxiang (安丰乡), a town in Anxiang County, Hunan Province